Mecca Declaration (or Makkah al-Mukarramah Declaration) may refer to:

 The Mecca Declaration of 1981 of the Third Islamic Summit Conference
 The Mecca Declaration of 2005 of the Third Extraordinary Session of the Islamic Summit Conference
 The Mecca Declaration of 2006, demanding an end to sectarian feuds in Iraq
 The Mecca Declaration of 2007, announcing the formation of a unity government including Hamas and Fatah